Misagh Memarzadeh (born 9 January 1983) is a former Iranian professional football player who last played for Saipa and Perspolis among other clubs in Persian Gulf Pro League.

Club career
He started his career in Saipa but after two years left the club after he had differences with the Italian coach Giovanni Mei and moved to Rah Ahan. He moved back to Saipa after one season and stayed there for two seasons. He moved to Persepolis in June 2008 but after his second match in September 2008 he was injured and could not play for about six months where he returned and played two times for Persepolis in ACL. He was a reserve goalkeeper for Sepahan in the 2008 AFC Champions League group stages. On 7 July 2011, Misagh Memarzadeh signed a deal with Iran Pro League side Persepolis. After a disappointing season in Persepolis, It was announced that he will leave the club at the end of the season.

Club career statistics

International career
He was part of the Iran U23 in the Olympic Qualifications in 2003 but did play any matches. He was invited to Team Melli in June 2009 for 2010 FIFA World Cup qualification.

Honours

Club
Saipa
Iran Pro League: 2006–07

Persepolis
Hazfi Cup: 2009–10

References

External links 
 Misagh Memarzadeh on Instagram 

1983 births
Living people
People from Tehran
Iranian footballers
Association football goalkeepers
Paykan F.C. players
Saipa F.C. players
Rah Ahan players
Persepolis F.C. players
Foolad FC players